Said Ali Hussein is a Somali-Dutch footballer who plays as attacker (association football) left winger for Dutch club Emplina and the Somalia national team.

Club career
Ali Hussein was born in Baidoa, Somalia. At the age of ten, Hussein moved to Schijndel, the Netherlands as a result of the Somali Civil War. After emigrating to the Netherlands, Saïd joined Avanti '31, making his debut for the first team at the age of 16. In the summer of 2018, Ali Hussein joined Den Bosch on trial, however ultimately stayed at Avanti '31. in 2021 he exchanged avanti for Emplina.

International career
On 9 December 2019, Ali Hussein made his debut for Somalia in a 2–0 loss against Uganda in the 2019 CECAFA Cup.

References

2000 births
Living people
People from Bay, Somalia
Association football midfielders
Somalian footballers
Somalia international footballers
Somalian expatriate footballers
Somalian emigrants to the Netherlands
Expatriate footballers in the Netherlands